Alberto Rossel Contreras (born January 26, 1975) is a Peruvian former professional boxer who competed from 1998 to 2015. He challenged for the WBA super flyweight title in 2010 and held the WBA interim light flyweight title from 2012 to 2014.

References
 sports-reference

External links

|-

1975 births
Living people
Peruvian male boxers
Light-flyweight boxers
Boxers at the 1995 Pan American Games
Boxers at the 1996 Summer Olympics
Olympic boxers of Peru
Pan American Games competitors for Peru
20th-century Peruvian people
21st-century Peruvian people